The 1984–85 OHL season was the fifth season of the Ontario Hockey League. The Sault Ste. Marie Greyhounds were undefeated in all 33 home games during the regular season. The Brantford Alexanders move back to Hamilton becoming the Hamilton Steelhawks. Fifteen teams each played 66 games. The Sault Ste. Marie Greyhounds won the J. Ross Robertson Cup, defeating the Peterborough Petes.

Relocation/Team Name Change

Brantford Alexanders to Hamilton Steelhawks

The Brantford Alexanders relocated and moved back to the city of Hamilton for the 1984-85 season. The franchise had previously played in Hamilton from 1953-1976 as the Hamilton Tiger Cubs from 1953-1960, and the Hamilton Fincups from 1960-1976. In 1976, the franchise relocated to St. Catharines and played as the St. Catharines Fincups for the 1976-77 season, however, the club returned to Hamilton for the 1977-78 season. The club then relocated to Brantford and was renamed as the Brantford Alexanders for the 1978-79 season.

The Steelhawks would play the 1984-85 season out of Mountain Arena while their new arena, Copps Coliseum, was being constructed and would not open until the 1985-86 season. The team remained in the Emms Division.

Windsor Spitfires to Windsor Compuware Spitfires
The Windsor Spitfires were bought by Peter Karmanos, the founder and CEO of Compuware in 1984 and were renamed as the Windsor Compuware Spitfires beginning in the 1984-85 season.

Tragedy
On January 4, 1985, Bruce Melanson of the Oshawa Generals collapsed at practice and died from a heart ailment known as Wolff-Parkinson-White syndrome which resulted in him having a rapid heartbeat because of electrical impulses in the heart taking extra pathways. He was 18 years old at the time of the incident. Melanson was a second round draft pick of the New York Islanders at the 1984 NHL Entry Draft.

The Generals wore black arm bands for the remainder of the season in memoriam of their teammate. In his memory, the club no longer issues the uniform number "9". A memorial scholarship was also set up at his former high school in New Brunswick.

Regular season

Final standings
Note: GP = Games played; W = Wins; L = Losses; T = Ties; GF = Goals for; GA = Goals against; PTS = Points; x = clinched playoff berth; y = clinched division title

Leyden Division

Emms Division

Scoring leaders

Playoffs

Division quarter-finals

Leyden Division

(1) Peterborough Petes vs. (6) Ottawa 67's

(2) Belleville Bulls vs. (5) Oshawa Generals

(3) Toronto Marlboros vs. (4) Cornwall Royals

Emms Division

(1) Sault Ste. Marie Greyhounds vs. (6) Kitchener Rangers

(2) London Knights vs. (5) Windsor Compuware Spitfires

(3) North Bay Centennials vs. (4) Hamilton Steelhawks

Division semi-finals

Leyden Division

(2) Belleville Bulls vs. (4) Cornwall Royals

Emms Division

(2) London Knights vs. (4) Hamilton Steelhawks

Division finals

Leyden Division

(1) Peterborough Petes vs. (2) Belleville Bulls

Emms Division

(1) Sault Ste. Marie Greyhounds vs. (4) Hamilton Steelhawks

J. Ross Robertson Cup

(E1) Sault Ste. Marie Greyhounds vs. (L1) Peterborough Petes

Awards

1985 OHL Priority Selection
The Kingston Canadians held the first overall pick in the 1985 Ontario Priority Selection and selected Bryan Fogarty from the Aurora Tigers. Fogarty was awarded the Jack Ferguson Award, awarded to the top pick in the draft.

Below are the players who were selected in the first round of the 1985 Ontario Hockey League Priority Selection.

See also
List of OHA Junior A standings
List of OHL seasons
1985 Memorial Cup
1985 NHL Entry Draft
1984 in sports
1985 in sports

References

HockeyDB

Ontario Hockey League seasons
OHL